

Ancient Greece

Poets (by date of birth)
 Phrynichus (tragic poet) (6th c. BC - post 475 BC) 
 Aeschylus (525 - 456 BC) 
 Pindar (ca. 518 - ca. 438 BC) 
 Sophocles (495 - 405 BC) 
 Euripides (480 - 406 BC) 
 Critias (460 - 403 BC) 
 Aristophanes (ca. 460 - 403 BC) 
 Phrynichus (comic poet) (5th c. BC)

India

Events
 Bimbisara, king of Magadha, hires poets to recite poems to his wife Khema describing the beauty of the monastery at which Gautama Buddha is staying in order to entice her to visit (approximate date)

Citations

References 
 S. Brunet, R. Smith, & S. Trzaskoma (eds. & trans.) (2004) Anthology of Classical Myth: Primary Sources in Translation. Hackett Publishing Co.: Indianapolis, IN.
 S. Hornblower, A. Spawforth, & E. Eidinow (eds.) (2012) The Oxford Classical Dictionary, 4th ed. Oxford University Press: Oxford, UK.

Poetry by century
Poetry